Chùa Cầu is a footbridge with a temple atop, located in Hoi An, Quang Nam Province, Vietnam. It is also referred to as  "Cầu Nhật Bản" (Japanese Bridge), "Japanese Covered Bridge", or "Lai Viễn Kiều".

Description
The footbridge is 18 meters long and 3 meters wide. A small temple sits on the north end of the bridge, with the entrance in middle of the bridge overlooking the water. The two bridgeheads are built with bricks with two spans each, while the middle portion of the bridge has five spans placed on brick pillars going into the water.  The building frame is made of wood and utilizes three separate, but integrated roof systems for the three portions of the bridge.

Chùa Cầu's temple has ornate decor, including porcelain bowls used to cap the ends of the roof tiles and statues of a monkey and a dog to symbolize the year construction started and finished based on Chinese Zodiac.  Chữ Hán can be found throughout the bridge and temple, including "Lai Viễn Kiều" in front of the entrance of the temple.  The temple historically has been an altar to Trấn Vũ with an annual festival dedicated to the deity on the 20th day of the 7th lunar month.

History
During the 16th century, Japanese merchants began to establish residence in the port city of Faifo (now Hoi An) and established their own enclave.  In 1593, one group of merchants began building a covered bridge to cross a neighborhood canal.  They finished construction in 1595 and improved access between the Chinese enclave on the other side. In 1653, Japanese residents built a temple atop the bridge as a way to, according to legend, placate the earthquake-inducing monster Namazu. With the 17th century withdrawals of Japanese merchants and Dutch East Indies company from Hoi An, Chùa Cầu and its surround neighborhood remained relatively preserved.

During a 1719 visit to Hoi An, Nguyễn Phúc Chu named the bridge Lai Viễn Kiều, which means "a bridge to welcome guests from afar". According to a date recorded on the roof beam and an inscription left at the bridgehead, the bridge was rebuilt in 1817, though it is not clear if the temple was as well.  The temple would be rebuilt in 1817, 1865, 1915, and 1986, gradually integrating elements of Vietnamese and Chinese architecture and design in lieu of its original Japanese elements.

As the structure is sinking due to underground erosion, there are current plans to prevent its collapse.

Honors and Designation
In February 1990, Chùa Cầu was granted the status of National Historic-Cultural Relic. In 2006, a 20,000 VND bank note was released featuring the bridge.

Gallery

See Also
List of bridges with buildings

References

Bridges in Vietnam
Pedestrian bridges in Vietnam